Todd Ruben Cruz (November 23, 1955 – September 2, 2008), was an American former professional baseball shortstop and third baseman, who played in Major League Baseball (MLB) between  and  with the Philadelphia Phillies, Kansas City Royals, California Angels, Chicago White Sox, Seattle Mariners, and Baltimore Orioles. He batted and threw right-handed.

Early years
Of Mexican American descent, Cruz was born in Highland Park, Michigan, in Metro Detroit and was raised in Mexicantown in Detroit. He attended Western High School in Detroit.

Early baseball career
Cruz was selected by the Philadelphia Phillies out of Western High School in the second round (26th overall) of the MLB amateur entry draft in June 1973, immediately signing a contract later that month. He finally made his major league debut five years later, playing only three games in September 1978 with the Phillies. With Larry Bowa established as the everyday shortstop, Cruz was traded to the Royals for Doug Bird on April 3, 1979, three days before the start of a new season.

The Royals, with a glut of outfielders, a need for a starting first baseman and having decided on U.L. Washington as its regular shortstop, dealt Cruz along with Al Cowens to the Angels for Willie Aikens and Rance Mulliniks at the Winter Meetings in Toronto on December 6, 1979, with Craig Eaton being sent to California to complete the transaction four months later on April 1, 1980. A midseason swap for right-handed pitcher Randy Scarbery on June 12, 1980 sent Cruz to the White Sox, where he became the starting shortstop. Unfortunately, a back injury sidelined him for the entire 1981 season.

In May 1981, Cruz was arrested in Edmonton, Alberta, where he had been sent to play on a 20-day loan to the White Sox's triple-A farm team, and charged with breaking and entering an Edmonton department store and stealing $2,500 worth of watches. He told the Chicago Tribune's Robert Markus that he was drunk when he made his way into the Hudson's Bay department store. "I guess I didn't know what I was doing or I never would have done it," Cruz told Markus.  "I didn't need anything they had in that store.". Cruz, who prosecutors later said had broken a plate glass window to gain entry and then used a hammer he found in the store to break into a watch display case, in July 1981 pleaded guilty to a reduced charge of attempted breaking and entering and theft and was given a conditional discharge and nine months probation.

The White Sox's search for a reliable batter capable of hitting for average resulted in Cruz being shipped, along with Jim Essian and Rod Allen, to the Mariners for Tom Paciorek on December 11, 1981. The  campaign was Cruz's most productive offensively as he established career highs with 57 runs batted in (RBI), 44 runs scored, 113 hits, and 16 home runs. He was supplanted as the regular shortstop by rookie Spike Owen during the following year.

Success with the Orioles
The Baltimore Orioles purchased his contract on June 30, 1983. In his first Orioles game on July 1, versus the Detroit Tigers, he drove in six runs with a three-run homer and a bases-loaded double, leading the Orioles to a victory in the city where he grew up. His biggest contribution was on defense. Manager Joe Altobelli explained Cruz's importance to the ballclub:

Shortstop Cal Ripken Jr. praised him even further:

Cruz, along with teammates at the bottom of the batting order Rick Dempsey and Rich Dauer, were famously nicknamed "The Three Stooges." Cruz was "Curly," while Dempsey and Dauer were "Moe" and "Larry," respectively. After winning the American League Pennant three games to one over a former team of Cruz's, the White Sox, the Orioles captured the 1983 World Series Championship in five games over Cruz's original ballclub, the Phillies.

His MLB career came to an end on March 29, 1985, when he was released by the Orioles in spring training. Orioles teammate Gary Roenicke said of Cruz's two seasons in Baltimore, "Even though he'd played for many other teams, he always thought of himself as an Oriole. He had an outgoing personality ... and he kept everybody loose."

Death
Cruz died on September 2, 2008, at age 52, while swimming in the pool at the apartment complex where he lived in Bullhead City, Arizona. The efforts of bystanders and responding paramedics to revive him were unsuccessful. The cause of death was a heart attack.

Bibliography
 Loverro, Thom. Oriole Magic: The O's of '83. Chicago: Triumph Books, 2004.
 Walker, Childs. "First Impressions," The Baltimore Sun, September 10, 2008.

References

External links

 Todd Cruz at The Deadball Era
 "Cruz, of Orioles' 1983 championship team, dies in swimming accident," ESPN.com news services, Friday, September 5, 2008.

1955 births
2008 deaths
Águilas del Zulia players
American expatriate baseball players in Venezuela
American baseball players of Mexican descent
American expatriate baseball players in Canada
Baltimore Orioles players
Baseball players from Detroit
California Angels players
Chicago White Sox players
Edmonton Trappers players
Kansas City Royals players
Major League Baseball shortstops
Major League Baseball third basemen
Miami Marlins (FSL) players
Oklahoma City 89ers players
Omaha Royals players
People from Bullhead City, Arizona
Philadelphia Phillies players
Pulaski Phillies players
Reading Phillies players
Rochester Red Wings players
Rocky Mount Phillies players
Salinas Spurs players
San Bernardino Spirit players
San Jose Bees players
Seattle Mariners players
St. Petersburg Pelicans players
Toledo Mud Hens players
Western International High School alumni